The Singapore Discovery Centre (SDC) is an 'edutainment' and tourist attraction by the Ministry of Defence of Singapore in Jurong West, Singapore. The centre includes exhibits which display the history of Singapore as well as an insight on the future.

History 
In 1992, Heritage Technology Exhibition, a member of the Singapore Technologies Group, announced to build a centre to show Singapore's success. The centre was projected to cost SGD30 million and to be built within SAFTI Military Institute in Jurong. The center will have 10,000 square meters of exhibition space.

SDC was opened on 24 October 1996. The centre was built beside SAFTI Military Institute at a cost of SGD70 million. It was officially opened on 23 November 1996.

SDC closed for redevelopment from November 2004 to June 2006. The centre reopened on 18 July 2006 by then Minister for Defence, Mr Teo Chee Hean.

Exhibits
In its first phase it developed showing Singapore's recent history - living under the flags of Britain, Japan, Britain, Malaysia before becoming an independent nation. Milestones in that journey were picked out in a theatrical setting. 'Singapore Today' showed the vibrant life in late 20th century Singapore. 

Other galleries include mini-theaters showing the role of tactics and planning in everyday life and showcased the Singapore Armed Forces. Indoor exhibits include 'So Singapore Theatre, Gateway, Portals, Build it, Crisis Simulation Theatre, Harmony Circle etc.

Outdoor exhibits includes a playground and the a display of aircraft.

The Chief Exhibit Designer for the centre's creation is UK based Neal Potter. The centre was planned by Canadian company Lord Cultural Resources and the building was designed by mgt Architects from Australia.

Outdoor exhibits 
The centre also has an outdoor exhibition of military hardware used by the Singapore Armed Forces. Permanent exhibits include an AMX-13 tank, UH-1H helicopter and a Skyhawk fighter jet.

Awards and recognition
 Tripartite Committee on Work-Life Strategy, 2012
 Work-Life Achiever Award 2012
 Minister for Defence Award (MiDAs), 2013
 Inducted into the MiDAs League for a five-year tenure as advocates of national defence
 Singapore Book of Records, 2020
 Longest Sheltered Walkway Fitted With Solar Panels
 Singapore Good Design Award (SG Mark) – Interior Design, 2021
 Awarded for SDC’s Permanent Exhibits Gallery: Through the Lens of Time
 NS Mark (Gold), 2021

References

External links

 Official site

1996 establishments in Singapore
Jurong West
Science museums in Singapore
Science and technology in Singapore
Scientific organisations based in Singapore